Gina DiMartino (born July 31, 1988) is an American soccer player from Massapequa, New York. She previously played for the Philadelphia Independence of Women's Professional Soccer and the United States U-23 women's national soccer team.

Her older sister Christina DiMartino was a midfielder for the United States women's national soccer team and her former teammate on the Philadelphia Independence. Another sister, Vicki DiMartino, is a defender for the United States U-20 women's national soccer team and currently plays for Western New York Flash.

References

External links

Boston College player profile

1988 births
Boston College Eagles women's soccer players
Living people
Footballers at the 2007 Pan American Games
Philadelphia Independence players
Women's Premier Soccer League Elite players
New York Fury players
Apollon Ladies F.C. players
Expatriate women's footballers in Cyprus
People from Massapequa, New York
American women's soccer players
Women's association football midfielders
Women's association football forwards
Pan American Games silver medalists for the United States
United States women's under-20 international soccer players
Pan American Games medalists in football
Massapequa High School alumni
Medalists at the 2007 Pan American Games
Women's Professional Soccer players
Sportspeople from Nassau County, New York
Soccer players from New York (state)
Long Island Fury players
Long Island Rough Riders (USL W League) players
American expatriate women's soccer players
American expatriate sportspeople in Cyprus